Quantum coupling is an effect in quantum mechanics in which two or more quantum systems are bound such that a change in one of the quantum states in one of the systems will cause an instantaneous change in all of the bound systems. It is a state similar to quantum entanglement but whereas quantum entanglement can take place over long distances quantum coupling is restricted to quantum scales.

Quantum mechanics